Sandra Ung (born September 13, 1974) is a Cambodian-born American attorney and politician from New York City. She is a member of the New York City Council for the 20th district, which is based in Flushing, Queens.

Early life and education
Ung was born in Cambodia to ethnically Chinese parents. Her family fled to Taiwan soon after she was born to escape the Cambodian genocide, and immigrated to the United States when Ung was seven years old.

After growing up in Flushing, Queens, Ung attended Hunter College for her undergraduate degree, and went on to receive her JD from Columbia Law School in 2001.

Career
Prior to seeking elected office, Ung held a number of jobs in and around New York politics, among them chief of staff to Assemblyman (and father to Grace Meng) Jimmy Meng, legislative assistant to City Comptrollers Bill Thompson and John Liu, and most recently special assistant to Congresswoman Meng. She has also worked as a practicing attorney at the firm Dorsey & Whitney.

2021 City Council campaign
In July 2020, Ung announced she would run as a Democrat for the 20th district of the New York City Council, held by term-limited incumbent Peter Koo, in 2021. She received influential endorsements from the Queens Democratic Party and Congresswoman Meng, and was among the top fundraisers in City Council races across the city, cementing her as the race's frontrunner.

In an effort to overcome Ung's advantages, seven of her opponents in the race formed a coalition together in May 2021, with each candidate encouraging their voters to rank other non-Ung candidates on their ranked-choice ballots. The seven ran on significantly different platforms–among them were John Choe, the race's most left-wing candidate, and Neng Wang, its most conservative–but argued that they were united against the Queens Democratic Party's influence.

Ung nevertheless emerged with a lead on election night in June, receiving 24 percent of first-choice votes. When absentee ballots and ranked-choice votes were counted two weeks later, she defeated former Assemblywoman Ellen Young 55-45%; she formally declared victory on July 7. Ung easily won the November general election in the strongly Democratic district.

Personal life
Ung lives in Flushing.

External links

References

Living people
1974 births
Politicians from Queens, New York
Hunter College alumni
Columbia Law School alumni
New York (state) Democrats
American people of Cambodian descent
American politicians of Chinese descent
American women of Chinese descent in politics
Cambodian emigrants to the United States
Taiwanese emigrants to the United States
Asian-American people in New York (state) politics
21st-century American women politicians
21st-century American politicians
Women New York City Council members
New York City Council members